Patrick Newell (born January 18, 1996) is an American professional ice hockey player who is currently playing with Stjernen Hockey of the Norwegian Eliteserien. He played collegiate ice hockey for St. Cloud State University where he earned All-USCHO First Team, NCHC Forward of the Year, and CM/AHCA All-America honors.

Early life
Newell was born and raised in Thousand Oaks, California. He first began playing organized hockey with the West Valley Wolves when he was eight years old. His father John played hockey growing up, which inspired Newell to take up the sport himself. He originally tried out rollerblading at the Rollerdome before committing to hockey.

Playing career

Early career
While playing with the L.A. Junior Kings, a AAA hockey team, Newell committed to play Division 1 hockey for St. Cloud State. As a student at Oak Park High School, Newell asked his parents permission to move to Alaska to play competitive major junior ice hockey. There, he joined the Fairbanks Ice Dogs of the North American Hockey League and was later traded to the Indiana Ice of the United States Hockey League. With the Ice, he recorded four goals and seven points in 12 playoffs games to help the team win the USHL Clark Cup championship. However, the Ice disbanded after the 2013-14 season and he joined the Penticton Vees of the British Columbia Hockey League. During his first season with the Vees, Newell helped the team win the BCHL playoffs and reach the RBC Cup semifinals, where he was awarded the Tubby Schmaltz Trophy.

Collegiate
Newell competed with the St. Cloud State Huskies men's ice hockey team for four years. He recorded his first collegiate goals in a game against the Miami Redhawks on October 30, 2015. At the conclusion of the season, he recorded seven goals and 15 assists for a total of 22 points. He was also one of six St. Cloud State University rookies named to the NCHC Academic All-Conference Team and was later added to the NCHC Scholar-Athlete Team. In his sophomore season, he led the Huskies with 20 assists and was a recipient of the a 2017 All-NCHC Academic Award.

Newell broke out in his senior year at St. Cloud State. He was named the NCHC Player of the Week for the first time on October 15, after recording five points in a two games against Alaska Nanooks. By November 14, 2018, he had tied his career high seven goals and tied the team lead with 12 points.  By the conclusion of the regular season, the St. Cloud Huskies ranked first in their division with Newell recording 18 goals for a total of 38 points through 32 games.  On March 14, 2019, he was named NCHC Forward of the Year for leading the conference in both goals and points. Later, Newell was named to the 2018-19 All-USCHO First Team, selected as a Hobey Baker Award Top 10 Finalist alongside teammate Jimmy Schuldt, and chosen for the CM/AHCA All-America First Team.

Professional
On March 31, 2019, Newell's collegiate career ended when he signed a three year entry level contract with the New York Rangers. A few days later, he signed an Amateur Tryout agreement with the Rangers American Hockey League (AHL) affiliate, the Hartford Wolf Pack. He made his professional debut on April 4 in a 5-2 loss to the Springfield Thunderbirds.

Following the completion of his entry-level contract with the Rangers, Newell having played primarily with affiliate, the Hartford Wolf Pack, was released as a free agent. On August 20, 2021, Newell embarked on a career abroad by agreeing to a one-year contract with Norwegian club, Stjernen Hockey of the Eliteserien.

Career statistics

Awards and honors

References

External links

Living people
1996 births
American men's ice hockey forwards
American men's ice hockey left wingers
Ice hockey players from California
Indiana Ice players
Hartford Wolf Pack players
Penticton Vees players
St. Cloud State Huskies men's ice hockey players
AHCA Division I men's ice hockey All-Americans